Mark A. Kirkpatrick is a theoretical population geneticist and evolutionary biologist. He currently holds the T. S. Painter Centennial Professorship in Genetics in the Department of Integrative Biology at the University of Texas at Austin. His research touches on a wide variety of topics, including the evolution of sex chromosomes, sexual selection, and speciation.  Kirkpatrick is the co-author, along with Douglas J. Futuyma, of a popular undergraduate evolution textbook. He is a member of the United States National Academy of Sciences.

Education
Kirkpatrick earned an undergraduate degree in biology from Harvard University in 1978 and a Ph.D. from the University of Washington in 1983. His doctoral advisor was Montgomery Slatkin.

Research
Kirkpatrick’s research focuses on fundamental questions in theoretical evolutionary genetics. He has studied the evolution of female mating preferences from a population genetic perspective and, in addition to Russell Lande, formally modeled  Ronald Fisher’s runaway concept of arbitrary intersexual selection and its role in speciation. Kirkpatrick has worked on questions in quantitative genetics, speciation, and chromosome evolution, focusing on the evolution of rearrangements such as inversions and fusions. He has also been actively involved in research on sex chromosome evolution and sex determination.

Notable awards  
Awards received include:
 Guggenheim Fellowship (1997)
 Poste Rouge Fellow, National Center for Scientific Research, France (1997)
 American Society of Naturalists President’s Award (1998)
 College of Natural Sciences Award for Excellence in Teaching (2002)
 Fellow of the American Academy of Arts and Sciences (2008)
 Miller Visiting Professor, University of California at Berkeley (2009)
 Elected member of the National Academy of Sciences (2020)

Representative works

Bibliography
 Evolution, Douglas J. Futuyma & Mark Kirkpatrick, 2017, 594 pages, Sunderland, Massachusetts: Sinauer Associates; 4th edition,

References

External links
UT Austin Bio
Kirkpatrick Lab Website

University of Washington alumni
Harvard University alumni
Evolutionary biologists
Theoretical biologists
Population geneticists
21st-century American biologists
1956 births
Living people